The Voyage of QV66 is a children's novel by Penelope Lively. It is set in a strange, flooded, somewhat post-apocalyptic England devoid of people, and centres on a group of animals consisting of a dog, a cat, a cow, a horse, a pigeon, and a mysterious character named "Stanley".

Plot
The characters travel in a boat (the QV66 of the title) with the intention of reaching London Zoo so that they can discover what Stanley is. They have a number of adventures along the way, including being joined by a parrot, several characters losing their way in a balloon, and Stanley himself getting locked in a bank vault. It is eventually revealed that Stanley is a monkey.

External links

1978 British novels
1978 children's books
British children's books
British children's novels
Post-apocalyptic novels
English-language novels
Books about birds
Novels about cats
Cattle in literature
Fictional Columbidae
Novels about dogs
Novels about horses
Fictional monkeys
Fictional parrots
Novels set in England
Novels set in zoos
Works set on boats
Novels by Penelope Lively
Heinemann (publisher) books